Mount Apo, also known locally as Apo Sandawa, is a large solfataric, dormant stratovolcano on the island of Mindanao, Philippines. Located on the tripartite border of Davao City and Davao del Sur in the Davao Region, and Cotabato in Soccsksargen, Mount Apo is the most-prominent mountain in the Philippines. The peak overlooks from Davao City  to the northeast, Digos  to the southeast, and Kidapawan  to the west. It is a protected area and a Natural Park of the Philippines.

Geology
Mount Apo is a flat-topped,  (above sea level) high stratovolcano with three peaks. It is the highest peak of the Philippines.

The volcanic history of Mount Apo is poorly known but eruptions have produced andesitic-to-dacitic lava. Mount Apo is not known to have had historical eruptions, and was incorrectly attributed to be the source volcano of the 1641 eruption of Mount Melibengoy, also in Mindanao.

Etymology and indigenous peoples
The name of Mt. Apo comes from Apo, a title of respect meaning "revered elder" in various languages of the surrounding Lumad tribes. It is the shortened form of the original Manobo and Kalagan name Apo Sandawa ("Elder Sandawa" or "Grandfather Sandawa"), the name of the spirit of the mountain. Apo Sandawa is also regarded as an ancestor spirit by the various Manobo and Kalagan tribes living in the foothills, including the Obo, Manobo Bagobo, Manobo Apao, Tagabawa, Matigsalug, Ata, Arumanen, Tinananen, Kulamanen, Tagakaulo and Kagan peoples. The mountain itself is considered sacred grounds. Various rituals to Apo Sandawa are conducted by the supreme waylan (shaman) known as the diwata, who also serves as the medium for Apo Sandawa and the ancestor spirits of the Manobo and Kalagan tribes.

Conservation

Mount Apo Natural Park

On May 9, 1936, Mount Apo was declared a National Park with Proclamation No. 59 by President Manuel L. Quezon followed by Proclamation No. 35 of May 8, 1966, then Proclamation No. 882 of September 24, 1996.

UNESCO World Heritage list

In 1987, the National Geographic Society based in Washington, DC in the United States, published a book entitled, "Our World's Heritage", where Mount Apo was noted as a 'site of World Heritage caliber'. The cover of the book also featured Mount Apo's iconic Philippine eagle, along with three other heritage sites which have already been designated as "UNESCO World Heritage Sites".

The Department of Environment and Natural Resources (DENR) submitted Mount Apo on December 12, 2009, for inclusion in the UNESCO world heritage list. The mountain is considered by DENR as the center of endemism in Mindanao. It has one of the highest land-based biological diversity in terms of flora and fauna per unit area. It has three distinct forest formations, from lowland tropical rainforest, to mid-mountain forests, and finally to high mountain forests.

A portion of the eastern slopes are also within the scope of the UNESCO Hydrology Environment Life and Policy (HELP) Network. The Davao HELP Network is focused on building collaboration among watershed stakeholders.

In March 2015, it was taken out from the UNESCO List of Tentative Sites due to the dramatic changes (such as logging, intrusion of companies and urban and agricultural landscape, exploitation, and poaching, among others) it experienced which does not constitute the UNESCO documents that describes the park. Better conservation and a change in the content of documents was recommended by UNESCO.

Climate 

The climate at the summit of Mount Apo is alpine (Köppen ETH) as its mean temperature does not exceed  in any month. It falls under the Type IV climate under the modified corona's classification wherein rainfall is relatively distributed throughout the year. Mean monthly temperature ranges from a low  during January to  during April. Monthly relative humidity ranges from 78% during March and April and 82% during June and July. Minima reach  in January and February.

In late March–April 2016, due to the extreme effects of El Niño caused by climate change and global warming, massive patches of forest fires and bushfires appeared on the slopes of the mountain, causing hikers on the mountain to halt their ascent. Tourism in the region was threatened due to a massive haze engulfing the slopes of the mountain. The mountain later recovered after the government and local stakeholders initiated a holistic recovery plan for the entire natural park.

Flora and fauna

The mountain is home to over 272 bird species, 111 of which are endemic to the area. It is also home to one of the world's largest eagles, the critically endangered Philippine eagle, which is the country's national bird.

Bodies of water

Lakes 

There are four major lakes in Mt. Apo. Popular of these are Lake Agco, used to be called "The Blue Lake" and Lake Venado, a well-known mountaineers camping site and a stopover towards the peak. Lake Macadac and Lake Jordan are found in the summit grassland.

Rivers 
Mount Apo is a headwaters catchment area of several major river systems like Marbel River, Matingaw River, connecting with the Kabacan River, part of the Pulangi River, a major tributary of the Mindanao River, the Tudaya Falls, Sibulan River, and Digos River, which flows into Davao Gulf.

Mt. Apo has 19 major rivers and 21 creeks draining its 8 major watersheds (PASAlist.1992). Out of the 19 major rivers, only two has studies as reported by SEA-BMB consultants for the Mt. Apo Geothermal Project Environmental Impact Assessment 1991. According to the report, there are two river ecosystems draining the geothermal site namely: (1) Marbel-Matingao river ecosystem- characterized by narrower river channels at highly elevated areas, much faster water flow, clearer water and rock boulder-rich water beds. The aquatic organisms in the area have expectedly lower biological productivity and species diversity. The report also concluded that this river ecosystem provides much less economic and commercial value for its biological production. The study identified 12 species of fish caught in the area; (2) Kabacan River- Pulangi River ecosystem- characterized by a much wider channels at flat areas, relatively much slower water flow, highly turbid waters and sandy mud river beds.

Waterfalls 
The Tudaya Falls Davao del Sur, in Mindanao in the Philippines. At , it is the tallest waterfall in Mt. Apo Natural Park. This waterfall flows into the Sibulan River, which flows to Davao Gulf.

Biological features

The grasslands are characterized by the dominance of Cogon grass (Imperata cylindrica) and Saccharum spontaneum. Other grasses and ferns also thrive, especially along banks of creeks, streams, and rivers and on steep slopes.

Geothermal energy

The Mt. Apo 1 and Mt. Apo 2 geothermal plants, each possess a rated capacity of 54.24 megawatts. 
Owned and operated by Energy Development Corporation (EDC) the power plants were commissioned in February 1997 (Mt. Apo 1) and June 1999 (Mt. Apo 2) respectively, under a build-operate owner contract arrangement. Located in Barangay Ilomavis, Kidapawan City, North Cotabato is the Mindanao Geothermal Production Field with a power output of 108.48 MW, currently the only power plant of its kind in Mindanao.

The Philippine National Oil Company geothermal plant supplies electricity to Kidapawan and its neighboring provinces, its completion boosted the city's economy.

Watershed and hydroelectric plants

The Tudaya Hydropower Plant 
The Tudaya Hydropower Plant, located near the foot of Mount Apo on the Davao side (Sta. Cruz, Davao del Sur), is composed of two run-of-river type plants that will contribute to the energy needs of Mindanao by early 2014.

The Sibulan Hydroelectric Power Plant 
The Sibulan Hydroelectric Power Plants have been generating 42.5 MW of clean and renewable energy for Davao since 2010. It is also composed of two run-of the river mini hydro power plants.

Sibulan A was completed and commissioned on December 26, 2010.

Hiking activity

At , Mount Apo is the highest mountain (peak) and volcano in the Philippines. It is one of the country's most popular hiking/climbing destinations.

The first two attempts to reach Mt. Apo's summit ended in failure: that of Jose Oyanguren (1852) and Señor Real (1870). The first recorded successful expedition was led by Don Joaquin Rajal on October 10, 1880. Prior to the climb, Rajal had to secure the permission of the Bagobo chieftain, Datu Manig. It is said that the Datu demanded that human sacrifice be made to please the god Mandarangan. But the datu agreed to waive this demand, and the climb commenced on October 6, 1880, succeeding five days later. Since then, numerous expeditions followed. These and more are described in colorful narrations by Fr. Miguel Bernad, S.J.

Several trails lead to the summit, coming from North Cotabato and Davao provinces. Arguably the easiest route to the Natural Park is through Kidapawan with an average hike taking 3–4 days roundtrip. In the classification system used by local popular mountaineering website PinoyMountaineer.com, the difficulty of the hike is 7 out of 9. Various sights along the trail include Lake Venado, the highest lake in the Philippines, the solfataras and the old crater near its summit.

See also
Philippine Institute of Volcanology and Seismology
List of active volcanoes in the Philippines
List of inactive volcanoes in the Philippines
List of potentially active volcanoes in the Philippines
List of geothermal power plants in the Philippines
List of protected areas of the Philippines
List of Southeast Asian mountains
ASEAN Heritage Parks

References

External links

 Apo — Philippine Institute of Volcanology and Seismology (PHIVOLCS)
 Apo — Global Volcanism Program
 Mount Apo — Summitpost
 Mt. Apo Natural Park — UNESCO Tentative World Heritage List

Mountains of the Philippines
Volcanoes of Mindanao
Landforms of Cotabato
Landforms of Davao del Sur
Two-thousanders of Asia
Volcanic crater lakes
Potentially active volcanoes of the Philippines
Stratovolcanoes of the Philippines
Subduction volcanoes
ASEAN heritage parks
Natural parks of the Philippines
Tourist attractions in Cotabato
Tourist attractions in Davao del Sur